The 1972–73 Divizia C was the 17th season of Liga III, the third tier of the Romanian football league system.

Team changes

To Divizia C
Relegated from Divizia B
 Poiana Câmpina
 Gaz Metan Mediaș
 Portul Constanța
 Vulturii Textila Lugoj

Promoted from County Championship
 Străduința Suceava
 Relonul Săvinești
 Locomotiva Adjud
 Constructorul Gheorghiu-Dej
 Unirea Tricolor Bârlad
 Chimia Brazi
 Știința Constanța
 Comerțul Brăila
 Sportul Ciorogârla
 Chimia Găești
 Recolta Stoicănești
 Textilistul Pitești
 Gorjul Târgu Jiu
 Victoria Craiova
 Unirea Tomnatic
 Constructorul Arad
 CIL Blaj
 Minerul Bihor
 Rapid Jibou
 Minerul Borșa
 Lacul Ursu Sovata
 Mureșul Toplița
 Foresta Susenii Bârgăului
 ICIM Brașov

From Divizia C
Promoted to Divizia B
 Delta Tulcea
 Gloria Buzău
 Metalul Turnu Severin
 Metrom Brașov

Relegated to County Championship
 Victoria PTTR Botoșani
 Constructorul Iași
 Luceafărul Focșani
 Gloria Tecuci
 Șantierul Naval Constanța
 Dunărea Brăila
 Mașini Unelte București
 Victoria Lehliu
 Aurora Urziceni
 Viitorul Slănic
 Muscelul Câmpulung
 Rapid Piatra Olt
 Progresul Strehaia
 CFR Caransebeș
 Victoria Caransebeș
 Constructorul Hunedoara
 ASA Sibiu
 Gloria Baia Mare
 Măgura Șimleu Silvaniei
 Minerul Rodna
 Progresul Năsăud
 Miercurea Ciuc
 Colorom Codlea

Renamed teams
Chimia Suceava was renamed as CSM Suceava.

ITA Pașcani was moved from Pașcani to Iași and was renamed as ITA Iași.

Automobilul Focșani was renamed as Unirea Focșani.

Șoimii Buzău merged with Tarom București, moved from Buzău to București and was renamed as Șoimii Tarom București.

SUT Galați was renamed as Constructorul Galați.

Dacia Galați was renamed as Oțelul Galați.

Unirea Tricolor Brăila was renamed as Chimia Brăila.

Metalurgistul Brăila was renamed as Viitorul Brăila.

Comerțul Alexandria was renamed as Automatica Alexandria.

Sporting Roșiori was renamed as CFR Roșiori.

Gorjul Târgu Jiu was renamed as Cimentul Târgu Jiu.

Foresta Susenii Bârgăului was moved from Susenii Bârgăului to Bistrița and was renamed as Foresta Bistrița.

Politehnica Brașov was renamed as CSU Brașov.

Independența Sibiu was moved from Sibiu to Cisnădie and was renamed as Independența Cisnădie.

League tables

Seria I

Seria II

Seria III

Seria IV

Seria V

Seria VI

Seria VII

Seria VIII

Seria IX

Seria X

Seria XI

Seria XII

See also 
 1972–73 Divizia A
 1972–73 Divizia B
 1972–73 County Championship

References 

Liga III seasons
3
Romania